Landlords' insurance is an insurance policy that covers a property owner from financial losses connected with rental properties. The policy covers the building, with the option of insuring any contents that belong to the landlord that are inside. Landlords' insurance is often referred to as buy-to-let insurance, however buy-to-let insurance is a type of landlords' insurance. It is important to distinguish between buy-to-let insurance which generally covers one property that has been purchased with a buy-to-let mortgage, and multi-property insurance, which covers two or more properties. Each of these types of landlords' insurance covers different things. Landlord insurance is separate from landlords' emergency cover.

The policy will normally cover standard perils such as fire, lightning, explosion, storm, escape of water/oil, subsidence, theft and malicious damage. Each insurance policy is different and may or may not include all these items. Optional coverage might include accidental damage, malicious damage by tenant, terrorism, legal protection, alternative accommodation costs, contents insurance, rent guarantee insurance, and liability insurance.

Landlords' insurance policies typically do not cover any personal property belonging to tenants, or otherwise protect the interest of tenants; although a liability policy protecting a landlord or property manager will be of benefit to tenants should they incur a loss for which the landlord is responsible.

References

External links

Types of insurance